The PlayStation Eye (trademarked PLAYSTATION Eye) is a digital camera device, similar to a webcam, for the PlayStation 3. The technology uses computer vision and gesture recognition to process images taken by the camera. This allows players to interact with games using motion and color detection as well as sound through its built-in microphone array. It is the successor to the EyeToy for the PlayStation 2, which was released in 2003.

The peripheral was launched in a bundle with The Eye of Judgment in the United States on October 23, 2007, in Japan and Australia on October 25, 2007 and in Europe on October 26, 2007.

The PlayStation Eye was also released as a stand-alone product in the United States, Europe, and Australia. EyeToy designer Richard Marks stated that the EyeToy was used as a model for the rough cost design.

The device is succeeded by PlayStation Camera for PlayStation 4.

Features

Camera
The PlayStation Eye is capable of capturing standard video with frame rates of 60 hertz at a 640×480 pixel resolution, and 120 hertz at 320×240 pixels, which is "four times the resolution" and "two times the frame-rate" of the EyeToy, according to Sony. Higher frame rate, up to 320×240@187 or 640×480@75 fps, can be selected by specific applications (FreeTrack and LinuxTrack).

The PlayStation Eye also has "two times the sensitivity" of the EyeToy, with Sony collaborating with sensor chip partner OmniVision Technologies on a sensor chip design using larger sensor pixels, allowing more effective low-light operation. Sony states that the PlayStation Eye can produce "reasonable quality video" under the illumination provided by a television set.

The camera features a two-setting adjustable fixed-focus zoom lens. Selected manually by rotating the lens barrel, the PlayStation Eye can be set to a 56° field of view (red dot) similar to that of the EyeToy, for close-up framing in chat applications, or a 75° field of view (blue dot) for long-shot framing in interactive physical gaming applications.

The PlayStation Eye is capable of outputting video to the console uncompressed, with "no compression artifacts"; or with optional JPEG compression. 8 bits per pixel is the sensor native color depth.

Microphone
The PlayStation Eye features a built-in four-capsule microphone array, with which the PlayStation 3 can employ technologies for multi-directional voice location tracking, echo cancellation, and background noise suppression. This allows the peripheral to be used for speech recognition and audio chat in noisy environments without the use of a headset. The PlayStation Eye microphone array operates with each channel processing 16-bit samples at a sampling rate of 48 kilohertz, and a signal-to-noise ratio of 90 decibels.

Applications
Like its predecessor, the EyeToy, the PlayStation Eye enables natural user interface and mixed reality video game applications through the use of computer vision (CV) and gesture recognition technologies implemented in the software. Though initial PlayStation Eye software has mostly been based on the same general techniques as the EyeToy (e.g. simple edge detection and color tracking, Digimask face mapping), since the announcement of the forthcoming camera-based PlayStation Move and Kinect (then known as "Project Natal") control systems at the 2009 Electronic Entertainment Expo, Sony has been promoting a number of other technologies available for the PlayStation Eye. Among these are the Vision Library, which can perform advanced facial recognition/analysis and CV-based head tracking, and PSVR (PlayStation Voice Recognition), a speech recognition library intended to support about 20 different languages. According to Sony; the facial technology can identify features such as eyes, mouth, eyebrows, nose, and eyeglasses; read the shape of the mouth and detect a smile; determine the position and orientation of the subject's head; and estimate the age and gender of the face.

In addition to gaming-oriented uses, Sony has stated that the PlayStation Eye will also feature applications for tasks such as interactive communication and content creation (e.g. movie-making and video blogging). An AV Chat feature allows for audio-visual chat with anyone on a user's PlayStation Network friends list (up to six at once). Additional free content and activities are planned for release via the PlayStation Network.

EyeCreate
The PlayStation Eye features free EyeCreate video editing software, which enables users to capture pictures, video, and audio clips directly to the hard drive of the PlayStation 3 console. EyeCreate features a variety of different capturing modes, including stop motion and time-lapse. Through the software, users can edit, save, and share their own custom images, movies, and audio content.

Videos created using the program can be exported as MPEG-4 files for use outside PlayStation 3 consoles.

PlayStation Move

First revealed on June 2, 2009, PlayStation Move is a motion control system for the PlayStation 3 based on video tracking and inertial sensors. Based on a wand controller, PlayStation Move uses the PlayStation Eye to track the wand's position in three dimensions through a special illuminated orb at the end. The controller was released in the EU, UK and USA in September 2010, with an Asian release date listed as October 21, 2010.

Compatible games
The following are some PlayStation 3 games with camera functionality, some of which may not be specifically developed for the PlayStation Eye. The PlayStation Eye does not support EyeToy compatible PlayStation 2 games.

2007
Aqua Vita/Aquatopia
Ember
Mesmerize (January 17, 2008 in North America)
Operation Creature Feature
The Eye of Judgment (uses PlayStation Eye on a stand and playing mat with cards to simulate card battles)
The Trials of Topoq
Tiger Woods PGA Tour 08
Tori-Emaki
SingStar
Sky Blue
Snakeball
PES 2008
EyeCreate (software, not a game)
2008
Buzz!: Quiz TV (also compatible with PlayStation 2 EyeToy)
Burnout Paradise (used to take personal snapshot after winning/losing against other players online. Also compatible with PlayStation 2 EyeToy)
FaceBreaker (used to capture personal image for the character)
GTI Club+: Rally Côte d'Azur
High Stakes on the Vegas Strip: Poker Edition (used to see others)
LittleBigPlanet
PES 2009 (used to capture personal image for the character, "Become a Legend" mode)
SingStar Vol. 2 (used to record video and take snapshots and upload online)
Tom Clancy's Rainbow Six: Vegas 2  (used to capture personal image for the character)
2009
Bomberman Ultra (streams video to other players when a tournament is won)
Buzz!: Quiz World
Tiger Woods 10
Fight Night Round 4
EyePet (Europe)
2010
Gran Turismo 5 (for head tracking)
EyePet
The Shoot
Kung-Fu Live (for full body tracking)
Def Jam Rapstar
Start the Party
Time Crisis: Razing Storm
TV Superstars
Buzz!: The Ultimate Music Quiz
The Fight: Lights Out (for head tracking)
EA MMA (for facial mapping on custom character)
Sports Champions
2011
Fight Night Champion
LittleBigPlanet 2 
Michael Jackson The Experience
Kung Fu Live
2012
Ōkami HD  
Unreleased
Eyedentify

PC drivers and applications
While there is no official support or drivers by Sony to run the PlayStation Eye on other platforms such as personal computers, there are community-supported drivers available for Mac OS, Linux, and NetBSD and a commercially available driver for Windows.

A video capture and analysis application is available for Windows.

See also
EyeToy
PlayStation Move
Xbox Live Vision
Kinect

Footnotes

References

External links 
 PlayStation Eye entries at PlayStation.Blog.US
 PlayStation Eye trailer featuring footage for Operation Creature Feature, The Trials of Topoq, and Aqua Vita
 PlayStation Network showcase featuring brief footage of Aqua Vita and Sky Blue
 PlayStation Eye Camera

Products introduced in 2007
PlayStation 3 accessories
PlayStation Eye games
Eye
Sony cameras
Webcams
Gesture recognition